Samuel Slocum (March 4, 1792 - January 26, 1861), was an American inventor from Poughkeepsie, New York. He was born in Jamestown, RI, son of Peleg Slocum and Anne Dyer Slocum.  He was raised in Usquepaugh, RI, a village in South Kingstown, RI, where a Mr. William Lockwood sometime after 1772, first invented the common pin with a head, to keep it from slipping through cloth. Samuel was the 6th of 8 children. He worked as a carpenter before he decided to move to London and become a pin maker. He married Susan Stanton Slocum in 1817 at Richmond, RI, and had three children, Samuel Dyer Slocum, Mary Slocum, and John Stanton Slocum.

Samuel Slocum traveled to England. While in England, he invented a machine for the production of pins. These pins later became flat head pins (similar to staples).

A short time later he moved back to the United States, to Poughkeepsie, NY and formed a pin manufacturing company, Slocum and Jillion, which invented a "Machine for Sticking Pins into Paper", which is often believed to be the first stapler. In fact, this patent from September 30, 1841, Patent #2275, is for a device used for packaging pins.

External links
United States Patent and Trademark Office drawing of Patent 2275

References

1792 births
1861 deaths
19th-century American inventors
People from Poughkeepsie, New York
People from South Kingstown, Rhode Island